Nationality words link to articles with information on the nation's poetry or literature (for instance, Irish or France).

Events
 First printed version of the Thai epic Khun Chang Khun Phaen.

Works published in English

United Kingdom
 Alfred Austin, Interludes
 Robert Browning, Fifine at the Fair
 C. S. Calverley, published anonymously, Fly Leaves
 Samuel Ferguson, Congal
 W. S. Gilbert, More "Bab" Balads (see also "Bab" Ballads 1869)
 Edward Lear, More Nonsense, Pictures, Rhymes, Botany, etc.
 Winwood Reade, The Martyrdom of Man
 Christina Rossetti, Sing-Song, book of nursery rhymes
 Alfred Lord Tennyson, Gareth and Lynette (see also Idylls of the King 1859, The Holy Grail 1869, Idylls of the King 1870, 1889, "The Last Tournament" 1871, "Balin and Balan" in Tiresias 1885),

United States
 Thomas Gold Appleton, Faded Leaves
 Paul Hamilton Hayne, Legends and Lyrics
 Oliver Wendell Holmes, The Poet at the Breakfast-Table, a book that combines fiction and nonfiction prose, together with poetry
 Albert Pike, Hymns to the Gods
 Celia Thaxter, Poems
 John Greenleaf Whittier, The Pennsylvania Pilgrim, United States

Other in English
 Alfred Domett, Ranolf and Amohia, epic poem in a Maori setting, New Zealand
 Henry Wadsworth Longfellow, Three Books of Song

Works published in other languages

France
 François Coppée:
, short verse drama inspired by the Franco-Prussian War; France
 
 Victor Hugo, France
 Catulle Mendès, verse drama, a one-act comedy; France

Other languages
 Hilario Ascasubi,  ("Complete Works"), three volumes compiled by the author; Argentine author writing in Spanish
 Girolamo de Rada, begins publication, Arbëresh
 Holger Drachmann,  ("Poems"), Denmark
 José Hernández, Martín Fierro, the first part of an epic Spanish-language Argentine poem in which the hero defends his way of life against encroaching socialization and civilization; an example of the Gaucho poetry literary movement in Argentina (see also second part 1879)
 Michel Rodange, Renert odder de Fuuss am Frack an a Maansgréisst, Luxembourg

Awards and honors

Births
Death years link to the corresponding "[year] in poetry" article:
 February 22 – John Shaw Neilson (died 1942), Australian
 June 27 – Paul Laurence Dunbar (died 1906), African American
 July 8 – Sasaki Nobutsuna 佐佐木信綱 (died 1963), Japanese, Shōwa period tanka poet and scholar of the Nara and Heian periods (surname: Sasaki)
 August 15 – Sri Aurobindo (Bengali: শ্রী অরবিন্দ Sri Ôrobindo) (died 1950), Indian nationalist, poet, Yogi and spiritual Guru writing mostly in English
 October 10 – Arthur Talmage Abernethy (died 1956), American poet, journalist, theologian and minister; North Carolina Poet Laureate 1948–1953
 October 18 (October 6 O.S.) – Mikhail Kuzmin (died 1936), Russian poet, novelist and composer
 November 7 – Leonora Speyer (died 1956), American poet and violinist
 November 30 – John McCrae (died on active service in World War I 1918), Canadian war poet, physician, author, artist and soldier best known for the poem "In Flanders Fields"
 December 6 – Arthur Henry Adams (died 1936), Australian
 Also:
 Hafiz Ibrahim (died 1932), Egyptian poet called "the poet of the Nile"
 Divakarla Tirupti Shastri (died 1920), Indian, Telugu-language poet; one of the two poets in the due known in Telugu literature as "Triupati Vankata Kavulu"

Deaths
Birth years link to the corresponding "[year] in poetry" article:
 January 21 – Franz Grillparzer (born 1791), Austrian dramatic poet
 March 20 – William Wentworth (born 1790), Australian
 March 31 – Samuel Henry Dickson (born 1798), American poet, physician, writer and educator
 September 2 – N. F. S. Grundtvig (born 1783), Danish
 October 15 – Handrij Zejler (born 1804), Sorbian
 December 24 – William Rankine (born 1820), Scottish physicist and engineer
 Also:
 Henry Howard Brownell (born 1820), American poet and historian

See also

 19th century in poetry
 19th century in literature
 List of years in poetry
 List of years in literature
 Victorian literature
 French literature of the 19th century
 Poetry

Notes

19th-century poetry
Poetry